Philanthus pacificus is a species of wasp in the family Crabronidae. It is found in Central America and North America.

Subspecies
These two subspecies belong to the species Philanthus pacificus:
 Philanthus pacificus arizonae Dunning, 1898
 Philanthus pacificus pacificus Cresson, 1880

References

Crabronidae
Articles created by Qbugbot
Insects described in 1880